Budiman Yunus (born 5 August 1972) is an Indonesian assistant coach for Persib Bandung. Previously he played as defender for Persib Bandung, Bandung Raya, Persikab Bandung, Persija Jakarta, Persema Malang, Persikabo Bogor, Persibat Batang, Persidafon Dafonsoro and the Indonesia national team.

In 2011, he started his managerial career with the Liga Primer Indonesia club Bandung FC.

Club statistics

Hounors

Club
Bandung Raya
 Liga Indonesia Premier Division: 1995–96

Persija Jakarta
 Liga Indonesia Premier Division: 2001

International
Indonesia
 AFF Championship runner-up: 2000

References

External links
Goal.com Profile

1972 births
Association football defenders
Living people
Indonesian footballers
Indonesia international footballers
Bandung Raya players
Persema Malang players
Persib Bandung players
Persibat Batang players
Persidafon Dafonsoro players
Persija Jakarta players
Persikab Bandung players
Persikabo Bogor players
Indonesian Premier Division players
Indonesian Super League-winning players